The XaviXPORT, sold as the Domyos Interactive System in Europe in Decathlon stores, is a fitness-based home video game console developed by Japanese company SSD Company Limited and released in the United States in 2004 during the sixth generation of video game consoles. The console uses cartridges and wireless controllers. The controllers are shaped like sports equipment (such as baseball bats or tennis rackets), with users' actions represented on the television screen through the use of sensors in the controllers. The manufacturer's suggested retail price for the XaviXPORT was USD $79.99 at launch. However, the system has been officially sold as low as $19.99 bundled with tennis or bowling in their 2013 Spring Cleaning sale. In 2013, Xavix's social media sites went silent, but the ecommerce site remained up until 2017 when the official domain expired.

Hardware
The XaviXPORT was developed by eight engineers who worked on the Nintendo Entertainment System. The processors were built into the games themselves with the more basic games using the same 8-bit 6502 CPU as the NES. More advanced games were released using the 16-bit 65816 CPU, the same CPU that the Ricoh 5A22, the CPU employed by the Super NES, was based on.

Software

Many games released for the system included specific controllers needed for the game to work, while other controllers were compatible with several games. The library of games is mostly shared between Japan and the US, with European releases being mostly exclusive.

There were  titles known to have been released. This list is incomplete. Some games are not confirmed to be the same/different between regional releases.

References

External links

 XaviX Shopping Page via The WayBack Machine
 Entry at Giant Bomb
 Entry at Video Game Console Library

Home video game consoles
Sixth-generation video game consoles
Products introduced in 2004
65xx-based video game consoles